Nagoya City Archives (名古屋市市政資料館) is a historic building located in the city of Nagoya, central Japan.

It was constructed in 1922 during the Taishō era, when western influences in architecture were increasingly fashionable in Japan. It was originally built as the Nagoya Court of Appeals building. It is designated today as an Important Cultural Property.

External links 

Government of Nagoya
Buildings and structures in Nagoya
Government buildings completed in 1922
Important Cultural Properties of Japan
Archives in Japan
Tourist attractions in Nagoya
City archives
1922 establishments in Japan